Dublin Township is one of the fourteen townships of Mercer County, Ohio, United States.  The 2000 census found 2,254 people in the township, 1,128 of whom lived in the unincorporated portions of the township.

Geography
Located in the northern part of the county, it borders the following townships:
Liberty Township, Van Wert County - north
York Township, Van Wert County - northeast corner
Union Township - east
Center Township - southeast corner
Hopewell Township - south
Liberty Township - southwest corner
Black Creek Township - west
Willshire Township, Van Wert County - northwest corner

The village of Rockford is located in central Dublin Township.

Name and history
Dublin Township was organized in 1824. It is the only Dublin Township statewide.

Government
The township is governed by a three-member board of trustees, who are elected in November of odd-numbered years to a four-year term beginning on the following January 1. Two are elected in the year after the presidential election and one is elected in the year before it. There is also an elected township fiscal officer, who serves a four-year term beginning on April 1 of the year after the election, which is held in November of the year before the presidential election. Vacancies in the fiscal officership or on the board of trustees are filled by the remaining trustees.

References

External links
County website

Townships in Mercer County, Ohio
Townships in Ohio